Vandana Tiwari known by her stage name Gehana Vasisth, is an Indian actress, model, and television presenter. After working for several brands as a model, she was crowned as Miss Asia Bikini.

Early life and background
Vasisth was born in Chirimiri, Chhattisgarh. Her mother, Meena Tiwari is a housewife and her father, Rajendra Tiwari was an education officer.

She has one younger sister Namrata and two younger brothers Vedant and Sankalp Tiwari. Her friends call her by the nickname Zindagi.

Career 
Gehana worked as a model for many international brands. She did about 70 advertisements. She won the Miss Asia Bikini contest of 2012. She did more than 80 advertisements. She later entered the film industry through lead role in a film called Filmy Duniya and she also worked in few telugu films as a "item song". later she performed a handful of lead roles. Also, she has worked in many web series including Gandi Baat season 3 on Alt Balaji.

Television 
She was introduced as an anchor in Sahara One Television Channel. Later she did a role in the serial Behenein on Star Plus and appeared as VJ on True Life show on MTV India.

Filmography

References

External links 
 
 
 

Living people
Actresses in Hindi cinema
Actresses in Telugu cinema
Indian film actresses
Female models from Madhya Pradesh
Actresses from Chhattisgarh
Actresses in Tamil cinema
21st-century Indian actresses
Female models from Chhattisgarh
Year of birth missing (living people)